The Jones Ridge Limestone is a geologic formation in Alaska. It preserves fossils dating back to the Cambrian period.

See also

 List of fossiliferous stratigraphic units in Alaska
 Paleontology in Alaska

References
 

Cambrian Alaska
Cambrian northern paleotropical deposits